KCBC-FM (94.1 FM, "KCBC 94") was a radio station in Des Moines, Iowa from 1949 to 1952. Its studios were located at 2323 Grand Avenue on the near west side of Des Moines.  The original transmitter and tower were also located on the property until 1950.  In 1950, KCBC purchased the former WHO-FM transmitter and tower on top of the Equitable Building at 6th and Locust in downtown Des Moines.

Format
The format that KCBC-FM adopted was an Easy Listening format that was targeted at people riding the city's buses.  At the rear of KCBC's Grand Avenue property there was a barn where they installed FM receivers in the city's buses.  The plan to target music and advertisements to the city's bus riders was not a profitable one, and after just four years, KCBC-FM left the air, donating their transmitter to the Des Moines Public Schools.  The school district used the transmitter to put KDPS on air the same year at 88.1 FM.  After KCBC-FM's license was deleted on December 9, 1952, no other station in Des Moines used the 94.1 frequency until 2005, when a low-powered radio station from Grand View University, KGVC-LP, signed on at 94.1 FM, which later shared frequency with KDRA-LP.

References

The history of KCBC from DesMoinesBroadcasting.com.  Accessed June 23, 2006.

Defunct radio stations in the United States
CBC-FM
Radio stations established in 1949
1949 establishments in Iowa
1953 disestablishments in Iowa
Mass media in Des Moines, Iowa
Radio stations disestablished in 1952
Defunct mass media in Iowa